Tushingham is a scattered community in the civil parish of Tushingham-cum-Grindley, Macefen and Bradley (Tushingham cum Grindley until 2015), in the Cheshire West and Chester district, in the county of Cheshire, England.

St Chad's Chapel, Tushingham is a Grade I listed building.  There are also a number of Grade II listed buildings which include Tushingham Hall, Tushingham House and the Blue Bell Inn.

Notes

External links

 

Villages in Cheshire
Cheshire West and Chester